Thaspium  is a genus of flowering plants in the Apiaceae (parsley or carrot family). A common name for the various Thaspium species is meadowparsnip or meadow-parsip. Its native range is eastern North America, from eastern Texas in the southwest to Maine in the northeast.

Species
There are four accepted Thaspium species and one accepted variety:
 Thaspium barbinode (Michx.) Nutt. – hairyjoint meadowparsnip
 Thaspium chapmanii (J.M. Coult. & Rose) Small – hairy meadow-parsnip
 Thaspium pinnatifidum (Buckley) A. Gray – cutleaf meadowparsnip
 Thaspium trifoliatum (L.) A. Gray – purple meadowparsnip
T. trifoliatum var. aureum (Nutt.) Britton

References

External links
 "The Unk Weed Remedy," 1872 patent medicine advertisement for extract of Thaspium cordatum originis.

Apioideae
Apioideae genera